Waldeck is an unincorporated community in northern Fayette County, Texas, United States.  Originally known as Long Prairie, the town is predominantly German and was named after Count Ludwig Joseph von Boos-Waldeck who purchased lands in the area in 1843 on behalf of the Adelsverein.

External links
 WALDECK, TX Handbook of Texas Online.

Unincorporated communities in Fayette County, Texas
Unincorporated communities in Texas
1843 establishments in the Republic of Texas